Chasmacryptum seriatimpunctatum is a species of fly in the family Sciomyzidae. It is found in the Palearctic.

References

Sciomyzidae
Insects described in 1907
Muscomorph flies of Europe
Taxa named by Theodor Becker